Vibha Saraf is an Indian singer-songwriter and Bollywood playback singer. She performs folk songs and writes and performs music for soundtracks, primarily Kashmiri folk-inspired songs. Her work has been featured on the soundtracks for the films Raazi, which went to win Best Film in the 64th Filmfare Awards, and Gully Boy, the fourth highest-grossing Bollywood film of 2019. In 2019, she was jointly nominated with Harshdeep Kaur for Best Female Playback Singer for the 65th Filmfare Awards and Best Female Playback Singer for the 20th International Indian Film Academy Awards for the song Dilbaro, from the 2018 drama thriller Raazi.

Early life and education 

Vibha Saraf was born in the Fateh Kadal neighbourhood of Srinagar in Jammu and Kashmir in India. During the exodus of Kashmiri Pandits from the region, her family relocated to New Delhi, India, when Saraf was three years old.

She began taking classes at Shriram Bharatiya Kala Kendra, studying Hindustani classical music for four years before studying pop music for five years. Saraf worked as a management consultant for five years before quitting to pursue music.

Career 

In 2013, Saraf moved to Mumbai to pursue her career in music. One year later, she had recorded her first soundtrack song, a duet with Arijit Singh titled "O Soniye" for Titoo MBA. The next year, in 2015, she sang "Feeling Avnavi," alongside Advait Nemlekar, for the soundtrack Gujjubhai the Great.

She released her debut single "Harmokh Bartal," in 2016. A bhajan from Kashmir that Saraf selected to celebrate Kashmir's culture and music, Saraf reinterpreted the song, with Tapas Relia composing it and Ashwin Srinivasan playing flute and Ankur Mukherjee, guitar.

In 2018, Saraf performed "Dilbaro" for the film Raazi. The song was written by Shankar–Ehsaan–Loy and was inspired by the Kashmiri folk wedding song "Khanmoj koor." She was nominated for an International Indian Film Academy Award for the performance in 2019.

In February 2019, Saraf released "Kab Se Kab Tak," a duet with Ranveer Singh. Saraf also co-sang the song "Dil Mein Mars Hai" alongside Benny Dayal for the Mission Mangal soundtrack, which was released in the summer of 2019. That same year, Saraf performed on the Gully Boy soundtrack in the duet "Kab Se Kab Tak" with Ranveer Singh.

Saraf has written music for Nucleya, whom she met briefly at an airport after a performance. The two exchanged music over WhatsApp and Saraf wrote lyrics. She has since written two songs for Nucleya and performed on one, the latter which was "Behka," for the film High Jack.

Music & Discography 

Vibha Saraf has appeared in music videos in her songs. She appears in the music video of the song 'Mumal' where she is a co-singer with a Rajasthani folk singer Dapu Khan.

Vibha also appears in her own music video 'Jalwe' along with Absar Zahoor.

She has sung for Bollywood and also in other Indian languages including Kashmiri, Telugu, Bengali & Tamil. She writes lyrics for both film and non-film songs & also composes songs for both the film industry and Independent music.

Singer 

Bollywood Songs

Songs 
Her non film songs where Vibha has composed, sung and written lyrics.

Lyricist

Other language songs 
In addition to Hindi and Kashmiri, she has sung songs in Bangla, Telugu and Tamil.

Musical influence

Saraf's music is influenced by traditional music of Kashmir, Jammu and Ladakh. Saraf cites the music she heard growing up, as sung by her grandparents and mother, as making Kashmiri music "subconsciously" in her. She wants more people to understand the sufism in the songs. She also finds inspiration in Kashmiri literature, including the poetry of Habba Khatoon and Lalleshwari.

In an interview with The Hindu in 2019, Saraf described her interest in sharing Kashmir-inspired folk music with a broader listenership as a responsibility that "falls on our generation" to "stick to our roots." In the interview, she expresses an appreciation for the preservation and popularity of Punjabi music.

Awards 
Vibha Saraf won the Best Female Playback Singer award for the song Dilbaro, Raazi at the 20th IIFA Awards held on 18 September 2019 in Mumbai, India.

Saraf and Harshdeep Kaur also jointly won the Best Female Playback Singer at REEL Movie Awards 2019 for Dilbaro, Raazi, as well as the Zee Cine Award for Best Playback Singer – Female for the same song.

References 

21st-century Indian women singers
21st-century Indian singers
Indian singer-songwriters
People from Srinagar
Living people
Singers from Delhi
Women musicians from Delhi
Bollywood playback singers
International Indian Film Academy Awards winners
Zee Cine Awards winners
Singers from Jammu and Kashmir
Women musicians from Jammu and Kashmir
1988 births